Madelen Haug Hansen (born 9 August 1993) is a Norwegian ice hockey forward, currently serving as captain of Linköping HC Dam in the Swedish Women's Hockey League (SDHL) and the Norwegian national team. She has received the Gullpucken as Norwegian player of the year twice, in 2015 and 2019. She has won three silver medals and two bronze medals in the IIHF World Championship - Division I, as well as two SDHL Swedish Championships.

She scored the first goal of the 2016-17 SDHL season, the first season in which the league was organised as the SDHL.

References

External links
 

1993 births
Living people
Norwegian women's ice hockey players
Linköping HC Dam players
Modo Hockey Dam players
People from Halden
Sparta Warriors players
Norwegian expatriate ice hockey people
Sportspeople from Viken (county)